Omar Gergely Salim (born 12 April 2003) is an  American-Hungarian taekwondo athlete. He is the youngest son of Gergely Salim, a former Olympic champion. He became a Hungarian citizen in 2022.

Career 
He won the gold medal at the 2021 European Taekwondo Championships men's 54 kgs. A month later, he qualified to the 2020 Summer Olympics through the 2021 European Taekwondo Olympic Qualification Tournament. At the Taekwondo event of the Tokyo Olympics he was not able to go beyond the preliminary round.

Personal life 
He was born to a Tanzanian father and a Hungarian mother. The youngest son of former Olympic, world and european champion Gergely Salim. His uncle Joseph Salim, was also a 6-time European medalist. His brother and training partner, Shariff Salim, was Pan American Junior champion in 2019, alongside him.

One of his main supporters and sponsors is Swedish footballer Zlatan Ibrahimović, as he used to train with master Gergely Salim at his dojang Salim's Taekwondo Center in Los Angeles. Zlatan played for LA Galaxy from 2018 to 2019 and was always passionate about taekwondo.

References

External links 
 

American male taekwondo practitioners
Living people
2003 births
European Taekwondo Championships medalists
Sportspeople from Los Angeles County, California
Taekwondo practitioners at the 2020 Summer Olympics
African-American people
African-American mixed martial artists

Hungarian male taekwondo practitioners
Olympic taekwondo practitioners of Hungary
21st-century American people
21st-century Hungarian people
World Taekwondo Championships medalists